Axel Edward Brian Hoyer (born October 13, 1985) is an American football quarterback who is a free agent. Since joining the NFL in 2009 as an undrafted free agent, he has started for seven different teams, the second-most in league history. Hoyer has spent eight seasons, over three separate stints, on the New England Patriots and was part of the team that won a Super Bowl title in Super Bowl LIII.

Early years
Born in Lakewood, Ohio and raised in North Olmsted, Hoyer attended Saint Ignatius High School in Cleveland, Ohio, where he played both football and baseball for the Wildcats. On the varsity baseball team, Hoyer played pitcher, infielder, and outfielder. In 2002, as a sophomore, he compiled an 8–1 record with a 1.99 ERA. He was the winning pitcher in the 2002 Ohio Division I State Championship game allowing 2 earned runs in 6 innings pitched.

In football, Hoyer compiled a 16–7 record (.696) as a two-year starter for head coach Chuck Kyle. In 2002, he completed 131-of-263 passes (49.8%) for 2,130 yards, 18 touchdowns, and 12 interceptions.  In 2003, he completed 258-of-412 passes for 5,570 yards, 45 touchdowns, and 15 interceptions while leading his team to a 9–3 record. He was named USA Today Prep Player of the Week for his performance against Shaker Heights High School. He was an Associated Press Division I all-state selection as a senior. He participated in the 2004 Ohio All-Star Classic and the July 24 Ohio-Pennsylvania Big 33 All-Star Game.

College career

Hoyer was redshirted by Michigan State University in 2004, where he earned Scout Team Offensive Player of the Week honors twice.  In 2005, he saw action in five games in which he completed 15-of-23 passes (.652) for 167 yards and two touchdowns. In a game against Illinois, he combined with Drew Stanton to throw seven touchdown passes, which tied the Big Ten single-game record. In 2006, he played in eight games and completed 82-of-144 passes for 863 yards, had four touchdowns and three interceptions. In 2007, Hoyer was an honorable mention All-Big Ten selection. He completed 223-of-376 throws (.593) for 2,725 yards, 20 touchdowns, and 11 interceptions in 13 games. He had six 200-yard passing games. In 2008, his senior year, he was listed among 26 preseason candidates for the 2008 Johnny Unitas Golden Arm Award, which is presented annually to the nation's top senior quarterback. That year, he played in 13 games and completed 180-of-353 passes (.510) for 2,404 yards and nine touchdowns and nine interceptions.

Professional career

New England Patriots

2009 season

Despite being invited to the NFL Scouting Combine, Hoyer was not selected in the 2009 NFL Draft.  He signed immediately after the Draft with the New England Patriots.

Hoyer debuted in the Patriots' preseason game against the Cincinnati Bengals, completing 11-of-19 passes for 112 yards. In the preseason finale against the New York Giants, he played at quarterback the entire game, leading the team on a comeback after trailing 21–0 in the first quarter to a 38–27 win, completing 18-of-25 passes for 242 yards, one touchdown, and no interceptions.

Hoyer finished the preseason 29–of–44 for 354 yards, including one touchdown, with a 98.1 passer rating. Of the four quarterbacks behind Tom Brady during training camp, the Patriots released Matt Gutierrez, Kevin O'Connell, and Andrew Walter, leaving him as Brady's only backup when the Patriots made their final roster cuts on September 5.

Hoyer made his NFL debut on October 18, in the second half of a game against the Tennessee Titans. On his first drive, he was 5-for-5 for 35 yards, concluding it with a 1-yard rushing touchdown, which set a franchise record for points scored in the Patriots' 59–0 win. In the regular season finale, against the Houston Texans, he appeared in the game and finished 8-of-12 for 71 passing yards.

2010 season
Hoyer entered the 2010 preseason as Brady's only backup. During the preseason, Hoyer completed 32-of-57 passes for 471 yards and three touchdowns, with one interception and four sacks. He saw his first action of the regular season late in a 34–14 loss to the Cleveland Browns, throwing his first NFL interception. In Week 17, against the Miami Dolphins, he threw a 42-yard touchdown pass to wide receiver Brandon Tate for his first NFL touchdown pass.

2011 season
Although the Patriots drafted quarterback Ryan Mallett in the draft over the summer, Hoyer retained his role as Brady's primary backup.  In the preseason, he threw for 296 yards on 25-of-42 passes with one touchdown and no interceptions.

Hoyer saw only limited action during the 2011 season; his only pass attempt was the Patriots' final attempt of the 2011 regular season. The pass, which head coach Bill Belichick asked offensive coordinator Bill O'Brien to call, was a 22-yard pass to tight end Rob Gronkowski to give Gronkowski the NFL record for receiving yards in a season by a tight end. In the playoffs, the Patriots defeated the Denver Broncos in the Divisional Round and the Baltimore Ravens in the AFC Championship Game to reach Super Bowl XLVI. The Patriots went on to lose 21–17 to the New York Giants.

On August 31, 2012, during final cuts, Hoyer was released by the Patriots. He practiced with Saint Ignatius players while hoping for another team to sign him.

Pittsburgh Steelers
On November 20, 2012, Hoyer signed with the Pittsburgh Steelers after injuries to starting quarterback Ben Roethlisberger and backup Byron Leftwich within a week of each other. Hoyer served as the backup to Charlie Batch in Weeks 12 and 13 against the Cleveland Browns and Baltimore Ravens respectively. He was released by the team on December 8, 2012. As of 2022, the Steelers are Hoyer's only team that did not start him.

Arizona Cardinals
Hoyer was claimed on waivers by the Arizona Cardinals on December 10. He replaced Ryan Lindley in Week 16 against the Chicago Bears, and completed 11-of-19 passes for 105 yards and an interception. On December 26, Cardinals head coach Ken Whisenhunt announced that Hoyer would start the season finale against the San Francisco 49ers, making him the fourth starting quarterback for the Cardinals that season. He finished the 27–13 loss 19-of-34 for 225 passing yards, a touchdown, and an interception. On May 12, 2013, Hoyer was released by the Cardinals.

Cleveland Browns

2013 season
On May 16, Hoyer was signed by the Cleveland Browns to a two-year deal. On September 18, in relief of then-starter Brandon Weeden, who was out with a thumb injury, the Browns skipped over second string Jason Campbell and named Hoyer the starting quarterback for the Week 3 game against the Minnesota Vikings. He threw for 321 yards with three touchdowns and three interceptions in the team's first win of the season. It was announced later in the week that Hoyer would be the Browns' starting quarterback for Week 4 against division rival Cincinnati Bengals, as Weeden remained out with a thumb injury. Hoyer led the Browns to another win, completing 25-of-38 passes for 269 yards and 2 touchdowns, along with throwing no interceptions in a 17–6 victory. The next day on September 30, Hoyer was named the starter for a third straight game, Thursday Night Football vs the Buffalo Bills. Despite being named starter for three straight games, Hoyer was not declared the official starter for the remainder of the 2013 season by Cleveland head coach Rob Chudzinski, who referred to the situation as "a week-to-week thing." He later added that, if Hoyer continued to exceed expectations, he would maintain his starting position. However, Hoyer sustained an ACL tear in the Thursday Night game versus the Buffalo Bills, ending his promising season.

2014 season
With the Browns' releases of Weeden and Campbell to free agency, Hoyer stated that he was confident that he would be the starting quarterback for the Browns, no matter who they would draft in 2014. The Browns drafted Heisman Trophy winning quarterback Johnny Manziel with the 22nd overall pick, who was known as one of the top quarterback prospects in the 2014 NFL Draft. Hoyer did not take this as too much of a shock, stating "I don't want people to think I'm sitting at home pouting." Head Coach Mike Pettine stated that Manziel would not simply be handed the job, leaving the starter position open to competition.

On August 20, 2014, Hoyer was tabbed the starting quarterback for the Browns to begin the 2014 season. Through the first six weeks the Browns were 3–2, with the two heartbreaking losses coming on last-second scores, and Hoyer possessing a 7–1 TD:INT ratio. During Week 5 against the Tennessee Titans, Hoyer threw for 292 yards, 3 touchdowns, and an interception. Despite trailing 28–3, Hoyer led the Browns to 26 unanswered points, securing the win with a final score of 29–28. It was the largest comeback victory in franchise history, and the largest for a road team in NFL history. Hoyer led the Browns to a 6–3 start, the franchise's best nine-game start since the team started 7–2 in the 1994 season. However, Hoyer struggled in the following four games, throwing only one touchdown while being intercepted eight times. As a result, the Browns lost 3 of those 4 games to fall to 7–6 on the season, jeopardizing their playoff hopes. In a Week 14 home loss to the Indianapolis Colts, Hoyer was 14/31 for 140 yards, 0 touchdowns, and 2 interceptions. He was repeatedly booed by fans throughout the game, and was heavily criticized for his performance following the loss. Through 13 games on the season, Hoyer had 11 touchdowns to 12 interceptions. Hoyer's struggles in this 1–3 stretch led many fans, pundits, and analysts to call for the quarterback to be benched in favor of rookie Johnny Manziel. On December 9, 2014, the Browns announced that Johnny Manziel would start in Week 15 against the Bengals in place of Hoyer. However, Manziel was injured in the 2nd quarter of the Browns' matchup against the Carolina Panthers and was relieved by Hoyer. Hoyer threw a touchdown and an interception while going 7/13 with 153 passing yards. In the fourth quarter, he threw an 81-yard touchdown pass to tight end Jordan Cameron to put the Browns up 13–10. However, the Panthers regained the lead on the next drive and went on to win the game 17–13. After the season, Hoyer's contract expired and he became a free agent.

Houston Texans
On March 11, 2015, Hoyer signed a two-year, $10.5 million contract with the Houston Texans. On August 24, he was named the starter for the regular season over former Patriots teammate Ryan Mallett. In the first game of the 2015 season, with Houston trailing to the Kansas City Chiefs 27–9, Hoyer was benched in the fourth quarter in favor of Mallett. On September 17, head coach Bill O'Brien announced that Hoyer would be benched in favor of Mallett for the second game of the season against the Carolina Panthers. In Week 5, during a matchup against the Indianapolis Colts, Mallett was injured and was replaced by Hoyer for the remainder of the game. Hoyer threw for two touchdowns but also threw a costly interception to give the Colts a 27–20 victory. Hoyer was then announced as the starter for the next game against the Jacksonville Jaguars. Hoyer led the Texans to a 31–20 victory over the Jaguars and was announced by O'Brien as the starter going forward. On January 3, 2016, Hoyer led the Texans to their first playoff berth and AFC South title since 2012 with a 30–6 victory over the Jaguars.

The Texans played in the first Wild Card Round against the Kansas City Chiefs, where Hoyer struggled, throwing for 136 passing yards and four interceptions. The Texans were shut out by the Chiefs 30–0.

Hoyer was released by the Texans on April 17, 2016.

Chicago Bears
On April 30, 2016, Hoyer agreed to a one-year, $2 million contract with the Chicago Bears. After an injury to starting quarterback Jay Cutler in Week 2, he started the Week 3 game against the Dallas Cowboys and threw for 317 yards and two touchdowns in a 31–17 loss. The following week, he threw two touchdowns for 302 yards in a 17–14 victory over the Detroit Lions. A week later in a 29–23 loss to the Indianapolis Colts, he threw for a career-high 397 yards, the most by a Bears quarterback since Jim Miller threw for 422 yards in 1999 and the fifth-most in Bears history. Hoyer also joined Josh McCown as the only Bears quarterbacks to throw for at least 300 yards in three straight games and later became the first to do so in four consecutive games after throwing for 302 yards in a loss to the Jacksonville Jaguars. Hoyer broke his left arm during the second quarter of a game against the Green Bay Packers on October 20, 2016. He was placed on injured reserve on October 24, 2016, after having surgery on his left arm, and was reported to be out at least eight weeks.

San Francisco 49ers
On March 9, 2017, Hoyer signed a two-year contract with the San Francisco 49ers. Hoyer started the first six games of the season for the 49ers. Through the first five games, Hoyer had completed 59 percent of his passes for 4 touchdowns and 4 interceptions as the 49ers lost all 5 games. During Hoyer's sixth start in Week 6 against the Washington Redskins, he was benched in favor of rookie C. J. Beathard during the second quarter after completing 4 of 11 passes for 34 yards. After the game, Beathard was named the 49ers starter. On October 30, 2017, Hoyer was released by the 49ers following the acquisition of Jimmy Garoppolo in a trade with the Patriots. It was also reported that Hoyer was originally part of the trade, but the Patriots did not want him included due to compensatory draft pick reasons.

New England Patriots (second stint)

2017 season
On November 1, 2017, Hoyer signed a three-year contract to return to the Patriots to be the backup to Tom Brady, with whom he started his career. On November 12, 2017, Hoyer was brought in to end the game after the Patriots led the Denver Broncos by more than 20 points. He completed 3 of 3 passes for 37 yards as the Patriots won 41–16. In the regular season finale on December 31, 2017, Hoyer was brought in to end the game after the Patriots led the New York Jets by 20 points. He completed 1 of 3 passes for 5 yards as the Patriots won 26–6. On January 13, 2018, he appeared late in the Patriots' 35–14 victory over the Tennessee Titans to kneel down in the victory formation in the Divisional Round. It was his second appearance in a playoff game.

2018 season
In the 2018 season, Hoyer played in five games in relief of Brady. He was active for the Patriots' Super Bowl LIII win over the Los Angeles Rams, but was the only active Patriot not to play a down. Due to his experience of playing under the offense system run by Rams head coach Sean McVay, Hoyer played a key role in preparing the Patriots' defense, which held the Rams offense to only one field goal.

On August 31, 2019, Hoyer was released by the Patriots after losing the backup job to rookie Jarrett Stidham.

Indianapolis Colts
On September 2, 2019, Hoyer signed a three-year, $12 million contract with the Indianapolis Colts. He came into the game on November 3 in place of an injured Jacoby Brissett and threw for 168 yards, three touchdowns, and an interception in the 26–24 loss against the Pittsburgh Steelers. In the loss, Adam Vinatieri missed a late field goal which would have won the game. Hoyer made his first start with the Colts in the following week's game against the Miami Dolphins. In the game, Hoyer threw for 204 yards, one touchdown, and three interceptions. One of the interceptions occurred when a Dolphins defender stripped a Colts receiver of the football in the endzone before the receiver could secure possession of the football. The result was a 12–16 Colts loss.

On March 21, 2020, Hoyer was released by the Colts.

New England Patriots (third stint)

2020 season
On March 25, 2020, Hoyer signed a one-year contract with the New England Patriots. Hoyer beat out Jarrett Stidham to serve as the second-string quarterback behind the newly-signed Cam Newton.

After Newton tested positive for COVID-19 prior to a Week 4 matchup against the Kansas City Chiefs, Hoyer became the Patriots' starter for the first time in his career. Hoyer struggled during the game, committing two red zone miscues that stopped the Patriots from scoring – a sack preventing New England from running another play before the first half ended and a fumble recovered by the Chiefs. Following the fumble, he was replaced by Stidham for the remainder of the game, which the Patriots lost 26–10. Hoyer was subsequently demoted to third-string behind Stidham and did not take the field for the remainder of the season.

2021 season
Hoyer re-signed with the Patriots on a one-year contract on May 18, 2021. On August 31, 2021, Hoyer was released from the Patriots during final roster cuts, but signed with the practice squad the following day. He was promoted to the active roster on September 18 as the second-string quarterback behind rookie Mac Jones and ahead of Stidham.

During a Week 7 rout of the New York Jets, Hoyer made his season debut when he relieved Jones in the fourth quarter. He completed three of four passes for 79 yards on a drive that extended the Patriots' lead to 54–13 and took the victory formation to seal the win. Hoyer again relieved Jones in the fourth quarter of the Week 10 matchup with the Cleveland Browns after the Patriots took a 38–7 lead. He threw a touchdown pass to wide receiver Jakobi Meyers to conclude the 45–7 victory, which was his first since 2019 and the first of Meyers' career. Hoyer made his third relief appearance during Week 17 against the Jacksonville Jaguars, throwing for 63 yards in the fourth quarter and completing the 50–10 rout by taking the victory formation.

2022 season
On March 14, 2022, Hoyer signed a two-year contract extension with the Patriots. He was named the second-string quarterback behind Jones and ahead of rookie Bailey Zappe. Hoyer started the Week 4 matchup with the Green Bay Packers after Jones was injured the previous week, but suffered a concussion during the first quarter and was replaced by Zappe in the 27–24 loss. He was placed on injured reserve on October 6.

The Patriots released Hoyer on March 16, 2023.

NFL career statistics

Regular season

Postseason

Personal life
Hoyer is married to Lauren Scrivens. The couple have a son, Garrett, and a daughter, Cameron.

References

External links

 New England Patriots bio
 Michigan State Spartans bio

1985 births
American football quarterbacks
Arizona Cardinals players
Chicago Bears players
Cleveland Browns players
Houston Texans players
Indianapolis Colts players
Living people
Michigan State Spartans football players
New England Patriots players
People from North Olmsted, Ohio
Pittsburgh Steelers players
Players of American football from Cleveland
Saint Ignatius High School (Cleveland) alumni
San Francisco 49ers players
Sportspeople from Lakewood, Ohio